Daggett Pass is a road mountain pass located in the Sierra Nevada. The mountain pass is traversed by State Route 207.

See also 
List of Sierra Nevada road passes

References

Mountain passes of Nevada
Landforms of Douglas County, Nevada